was a Japanese samurai of the Sengoku period, who served the Mōri clan. He was also known as Shinagawa Katsumori (品川 勝盛), Shinagawa Daizen (品川 大膳) and Shinagawa Ōkaminosuke (品川 狼之介).

References

Mōri retainers
Samurai
1544 births
1565 deaths